Francesco Nappi (1565 – 1630s) was an Italian painter, mainly recalled for his decorative frescoes in a Mannerist style.

Biography
He was born in Milan. He painted for one of the chapels in Santa Croce in Gerusalemme and Santa Maria della Consolazione. He died in Rome age 65.

Sources

16th-century Italian painters
Italian male painters
17th-century Italian painters
Renaissance painters
Mannerist painters
1565 births
1630s deaths